In field theory, a branch of algebra, a primary extension L of K is a field extension such that the algebraic closure of K in L is purely inseparable over K.

Properties
 An extension L/K is primary if and only if it is linearly disjoint from the separable closure of K over K.
 A subextension of a primary extension is primary.
 A primary extension of a primary extension is primary (transitivity).
 Any extension of a separably closed field is primary.
 An extension is regular if and only if it is separable and primary.
 A primary extension of a perfect field is regular.

References

 

Field (mathematics)